Pegasus in Space (2000) is a science fiction novel by American writer Anne McCaffrey, set in her "Talents Universe". It is the sequel to Pegasus in Flight and it completed a trilogy initiated in 1969.

This novel serves as a bridge between the Pegasus and the Tower and Hive books, two Talents sub-series. It establishes Peter Reidinger as the first Prime and shows the origins of the Tower system of teleporters seen in The Rowan and its sequels.

Synopsis
Peter Reidinger, the telepathic and telekinetic Talent introduced in Pegasus in Flight, proves to be one of the most important psychic Talents in human history; his ability to tap into outside sources of energy gives him potentially unlimited power, but there are ruthless enemies of all Talent who must be stopped, or all mankind will pay the price.

References

External links
 
 

2000 American novels
2000 science fiction novels
To Ride Pegasus
Novels by Anne McCaffrey
Fictional telepaths